The 1993/1994 season in Dutch football saw Ajax Amsterdam winning the title in the Eredivisie, while Feyenoord Rotterdam won the Dutch National Cup.

PTT Telecom Cup

Eredivisie

Champions League : Ajax
Cup Winners Cup: Feyenoord
UEFA Cup: PSV, Vitesse and FC Twente
Promotion / relegation play-offs ("Nacompetitie"): RKC and VVV 
Relegated: Cambuur

Topscorers

Awards

Dutch Footballer of the Year
 1993 — Jari Litmanen (Ajax Amsterdam)
 1994 — Ronald de Boer (Ajax Amsterdam)

Dutch Golden Shoe Winner
 1993 — Marc Overmars (Ajax Amsterdam)
 1994 — Ed de Goey (Feyenoord Rotterdam)

Ajax Winning Squad 1993-'94

Goal
 Stanley Menzo
 Edwin van der Sar

Defence
 Rob Alflen
 Danny Blind
 Frank de Boer
 Frank Rijkaard
 Sonny Silooy

Midfield
 Ronald de Boer
 John van den Brom
 Edgar Davids
 Michel Kreek
 Jari Litmanen
 Tarik Oulida
 Martijn Reuser
 Clarence Seedorf

Attack
 Finidi George
 Nwankwo Kanu
 Marc Overmars
 Dan Petersen
 Stefan Pettersson
 Peter van Vossen

Management
 Louis van Gaal (Coach)
 Gerard van der Lem (Assistant)
 Bobby Haarms (Assistant)

Eerste Divisie

Promoted : Dordrecht '90
Promotion / Relegation play-offs ("Nacompetitie") : NEC, AZ, Heracles, Telstar, Graafschap and ADO Den Haag

Promotion and relegation

Group A

Group B

Stayed / Promoted : RKC Waalwijk and NEC Nijmegen
Relegated: VVV Venlo

KNVB Cup

Dutch national team

References
 RSSSF Archive